Boxing (also known as "Western boxing" or "pugilism") is a combat sport in which two people, usually wearing protective gloves and other protective equipment such as hand wraps and mouthguards, throw punches at each other for a predetermined amount of time in a boxing ring.

Although the term "boxing" is commonly attributed to "western boxing", in which only the fists are involved, boxing has developed in various ways in different geographical areas and cultures. In global terms, boxing is a set of combat sports focused on striking, in which two opponents face each other in a fight using at least their fists, and possibly involving other actions such as kicks, elbow strikes, knee strikes, and headbutts, depending on the rules. Some of the forms of the modern sport are western boxing, bare knuckle boxing, kickboxing, muay-thai, lethwei, savate, and sanda. Boxing techniques have been incorporated into many martial arts, military systems, and other combat sports.

Though humans have fought in hand-to-hand combat since the dawn of human history and the origin of the sport of boxing is unknown, according to some sources boxing has prehistoric origins in present-day Ethiopia where it appeared in the sixth millennium BC and when the Egyptians invaded Nubia they learned the art of boxing from the local population and they took the sport to Egypt where it became popular and from Egypt boxing spread to other countries including Greece, and eastward to Mesopotamia and northward to Rome.

The earliest visual evidence of any type of boxing is from Egypt and Sumer both from the third millennia and can be seen in Sumerian carvings from the third and second millennia BC. The earliest evidence of boxing rules date back to Ancient Greece, where boxing was established as an Olympic game in 688 BC. Boxing evolved from 16th- and 18th-century prizefights, largely in Great Britain, to the forerunner of modern boxing in the mid-19th century with the 1867 introduction of the Marquess of Queensberry Rules.

Amateur boxing is both an Olympic and Commonwealth Games sport and is a standard fixture in most international games—it also has its own world championships. Boxing is overseen by a referee over a series of one-to-three-minute intervals called "rounds".

A winner can be resolved before the completion of the rounds when a referee deems an opponent incapable of continuing, disqualifies an opponent, or the opponent resigns.  When the fight reaches the end of its final round with both opponents still standing, the judges' scorecards determine the victor. In case both fighters gain equal scores from the judges, a professional bout is considered a draw. In Olympic boxing, because a winner must be declared, judges award the contest to one fighter on technical criteria.

History

Ancient history

Hitting with different extremities of the body, such as kicks and punches, as an act of human aggression, has existed across the world throughout human history, being a combat system as old as wrestling. However, in terms of sports competition, due to the lack of writing in the prehistoric times and the lack of references, it is not possible to determine rules of any kind of boxing in prehistory, and in ancient times only can be inferred from the few intact sources and references to the sport.

The origin of the sport of boxing is unknown, however according to some sources boxing has prehistoric origins in present-day Ethiopia, where it appeared in the sixth millennium BC. When the Egyptians invaded Nubia they learned the art of boxing from the local population, and they took the sport to Egypt where it became popular. From Egypt, boxing spread to other countries including Greece, eastward to Mesopotamia, and northward to Rome. 

The earliest visual evidence of boxing comes from Egypt and Sumer both from the third millennium BC.   A relief sculpture from Egyptian Thebes shows both boxers and spectators. These early Middle-Eastern and Egyptian depictions showed contests where fighters were either bare-fisted or had a band supporting the wrist. The earliest evidence of use of gloves can be found in Minoan Crete (–1400 BC).

Various types of boxing existed in ancient India. The earliest references to musti-yuddha come from classical Vedic epics such as the Rig Veda (c. 1500–1000 BCE) and Ramayana (c. 700–400 BCE). The Mahabharata describes two combatants boxing with clenched fists and fighting with kicks, finger strikes, knee strikes and headbutts during the time of King Virata. Duels (niyuddham) were often fought to the death. During the period of the Western Satraps, the ruler Rudradaman—in addition to being well-versed in "the great sciences" which included Indian classical music, Sanskrit grammar, and logic—was said to be an excellent horseman, charioteer, elephant rider, swordsman and boxer. The Gurbilas Shemi, an 18th-century Sikh text, gives numerous references to musti-yuddha. The martial art is related to other forms of martial arts found in other parts of the Indian cultural sphere including Muay Thai in Thailand, Muay Lao in Laos, Pradal Serey in Cambodia and Lethwei in Myanmar.

In Ancient Greece boxing was a well developed sport called pygmachia, and enjoyed consistent popularity. In Olympic terms, it was first introduced in the 23rd Olympiad, 688 BC. The boxers would wind leather thongs around their hands in order to protect them. There were no rounds and boxers fought until one of them acknowledged defeat or could not continue. Weight categories were not used, which meant heavier fighters had a tendency to dominate. The style of boxing practiced typically featured an advanced left leg stance, with the left arm semi-extended as a guard, in addition to being used for striking, and with the right arm drawn back ready to strike. It was the head of the opponent which was primarily targeted, and there is little evidence to suggest that targeting the body or the use of kicks was common, which resembles it in that sense of modern western boxing.

Boxing was a popular spectator sport in Ancient Rome. Fighters protected their knuckles with leather strips wrapped around their fists. Eventually harder leather was used and the strips became a weapon. Metal studs were introduced to the strips to make the cestus. Fighting events were held at Roman amphitheatres.

Early London prize ring rules

Records of boxing activity disappeared in the west after the fall of the Western Roman Empire when the wearing of weapons became common once again and interest in fighting with the fists waned. However, there are detailed records of various fist-fighting sports that were maintained in different cities and provinces of Italy between the 12th and 17th centuries. There was also a sport in ancient Rus called kulachniy boy or 'fist fighting'.

As the wearing of swords became less common, there was renewed interest in fencing with the fists. The sport later resurfaced in England during the early 16th century in the form of bare-knuckle boxing, sometimes referred to as prizefighting. The first documented account of a bare-knuckle fight in England appeared in 1681 in the London Protestant Mercury, and the first English bare-knuckle champion was James Figg in 1719. This is also the time when the word "boxing" first came to be used. This earliest form of modern boxing was very different. Contests in Mr. Figg's time, in addition to fist fighting, also contained fencing and cudgeling. On 6 January 1681, the first recorded boxing match took place in Britain when Christopher Monck, 2nd Duke of Albemarle (and later Lieutenant Governor of Jamaica), engineered a bout between his butler and his butcher with the latter winning the prize.

Early fighting had no written rules. There were no weight divisions or round limits, and no referee. In general, it was extremely chaotic. An early article on boxing was published in Nottingham in 1713, by Sir Thomas Parkyns, 2nd Baronet, a wrestling patron from Bunny, Nottinghamshire, who had practised the techniques he described. The article, a single page in his manual of wrestling and fencing, Progymnasmata: The inn-play, or Cornish-hugg wrestler, described a system of headbutting, punching, eye-gouging, chokes, and hard throws, not recognized in boxing today.

The first boxing rules, called the Broughton Rules, were introduced by champion Jack Broughton in 1743 to protect fighters in the ring where deaths sometimes occurred. Under these rules, if a man went down and could not continue after a count of 30 seconds, the fight was over. Hitting a downed fighter and grasping below the waist were prohibited. Broughton encouraged the use of "mufflers", a form of padded bandage or mitten, to be used in "jousting" or sparring sessions in training, and in exhibition matches.

These rules did allow the fighters an advantage not enjoyed by today's boxers; they permitted the fighter to drop to one knee to end the round and begin the 30-second count at any time. Thus a fighter realizing he was in trouble had an opportunity to recover. However, this was considered "unmanly" and was frequently disallowed by additional rules negotiated by the seconds of the boxers. In modern boxing, there is a three-minute limit to rounds (unlike the downed fighter ends the round rule). Intentionally going down in modern boxing will cause the recovering fighter to lose points in the scoring system. Furthermore, as the contestants did not have heavy leather gloves and wristwraps to protect their hands, they used different punching technique to preserve their hands because the head was a common target to hit full out. Almost all period manuals have powerful straight punches with the whole body behind them to the face (including forehead) as the basic blows.

The British sportswriter Pierce Egan coined the term "the sweet science" as an epithet for prizefighting – or more fully "the sweet science of bruising" as a description of England's bare-knuckle fight scene in the early nineteenth century.

Boxing could also be used to settle disputes even by females. In 1790 in Waddington, Lincolnshire Mary Farmery and Susanna Locker both laid claim to the affections of a young man; this produced a challenge from the former to fight for the prize, which was accepted by the latter. Proper sidesmen were chosen, and every matter conducted in form. After several knock-down blows on both sides, the battle ended in favour of Mary Farmery.

The London Prize Ring Rules introduced measures that remain in effect for professional boxing to this day, such as outlawing butting, gouging, scratching, kicking, hitting a man while down, holding the ropes, and using resin, stones or hard objects in the hands, and biting.

Marquess of Queensberry rules (1867)
In 1867, the Marquess of Queensberry rules were drafted by John Chambers for amateur championships held at Lillie Bridge in London for lightweights, middleweights and heavyweights. The rules were published under the patronage of the Marquess of Queensberry, whose name has always been associated with them.

There were twelve rules in all, and they specified that fights should be "a fair stand-up boxing match" in a 24-foot-square or similar ring. Rounds were three minutes with one-minute rest intervals between rounds. Each fighter was given a ten-second count if he was knocked down, and wrestling was banned.
The introduction of gloves of "fair-size" also changed the nature of the bouts. An average pair of boxing gloves resembles a bloated pair of mittens and are laced up around the wrists.
The gloves can be used to block an opponent's blows. As a result of their introduction, bouts became longer and more strategic with greater importance attached to defensive maneuvers such as slipping, bobbing, countering and angling. Because less defensive emphasis was placed on the use of the forearms and more on the gloves, the classical forearms outwards, torso leaning back stance of the bare knuckle boxer was modified to a more modern stance in which the torso is tilted forward and the hands are held closer to the face.

Late 19th and early 20th centuries
Through the late nineteenth century, the martial art of boxing or prizefighting was primarily a sport of dubious legitimacy. Outlawed in England and much of the United States, prizefights were often held at gambling venues and broken up by police. Brawling and wrestling tactics continued, and riots at prizefights were common occurrences. Still, throughout this period, there arose some notable bare knuckle champions who developed fairly sophisticated fighting tactics.

The English case of R v. Coney in 1882 found that a bare-knuckle fight was an assault occasioning actual bodily harm, despite the consent of the participants. This marked the end of widespread public bare-knuckle contests in England.

The first world heavyweight champion under the Queensberry Rules was "Gentleman Jim" Corbett, who defeated John L. Sullivan in 1892 at the Pelican Athletic Club in New Orleans.

The first instance of film censorship in the United States occurred in 1897 when several states banned the showing of prize fighting films from the state of Nevada, where it was legal at the time.

Throughout the early twentieth century, boxers struggled to achieve legitimacy. They were aided by the influence of promoters like Tex Rickard and the popularity of great champions such as John L. Sullivan.

Modern boxing 

The modern sport arose from illegal venues and outlawed prizefighting and has become a multibillion-dollar commercial enterprise. A majority of young talent still comes from poverty-stricken areas around the world. Places like Mexico, Africa, South America, and Eastern Europe prove to be filled with young aspiring athletes who wish to become the future of boxing. Even in the U.S., places like the inner cities of New York, and Chicago have given rise to promising young talent. According to Rubin, "boxing lost its appeal with the American middle class, and most of who boxes in modern America come from the streets and are street fighters".

Rules

The Marquess of Queensberry rules have been the general rules governing modern boxing since their publication in 1867.

A boxing match typically consists of a determined number of three-minute rounds, a total of up to 9 to 12 rounds with a minute spent between each round with the fighters resting in their assigned corners and receiving advice and attention from their coach and staff. The fight is controlled by a referee who works within the ring to judge and control the conduct of the fighters, rule on their ability to fight safely, count knocked-down fighters, and rule on fouls.

Up to three judges are typically present at ringside to score the bout and assign points to the boxers, based on punches and elbows that connect, defense, knockdowns, hugging and other, more subjective, measures. Because of the open-ended style of boxing judging, many fights have controversial results, in which one or both fighters believe they have been "robbed" or unfairly denied a victory. Each fighter has an assigned corner of the ring, where their coach, as well as one or more "seconds" may administer to the fighter at the beginning of the fight and between rounds. Each boxer enters into the ring from their assigned corners at the beginning of each round and must cease fighting and return to their corner at the signalled end of each round.

A bout in which the predetermined number of rounds passes is decided by the judges, and is said to "go the distance". The fighter with the higher score at the end of the fight is ruled the winner. With three judges, unanimous and split decisions are possible, as are draws. A boxer may win the bout before a decision is reached through a knock-out; such bouts are said to have ended "inside the distance". If a fighter is knocked down during the fight, determined by whether the boxer touches the canvas floor of the ring with any part of their body other than the feet as a result of the opponent's punch and not a slip, as determined by the referee, the referee begins counting until the fighter returns to their feet and can continue. Some jurisdictions require the referee to count to eight regardless of if the fighter gets up before.

Should the referee count to ten, then the knocked-down boxer is ruled "knocked out" (whether unconscious or not) and the other boxer is ruled the winner by knockout (KO). A "technical knock-out" (TKO) is possible as well, and is ruled by the referee, fight doctor, or a fighter's corner if a fighter is unable to safely continue to fight, based upon injuries or being judged unable to effectively defend themselves. Many jurisdictions and sanctioning agencies also have a "three-knockdown rule", in which three knockdowns in a given round result in a TKO. A TKO is considered a knockout in a fighter's record. A "standing eight" count rule may also be in effect. This gives the referee the right to step in and administer a count of eight to a fighter that the referee feels may be in danger, even if no knockdown has taken place. After counting the referee will observe the fighter, and decide if the fighter is fit to continue. For scoring purposes, a standing eight count is treated as a knockdown.

In general, boxers are prohibited from hitting below the belt, holding, tripping, pushing, biting, or spitting. The boxer's shorts are raised so the opponent is not allowed to hit to the groin area with intent to cause pain or injury. Failure to abide by the former may result in a foul. They also are prohibited from kicking, head-butting, or hitting with any part of the arm other than the knuckles of a closed fist (including hitting with the elbow, shoulder or forearm, as well as with open gloves, the wrist, the inside, back or side of the hand). They are prohibited as well from hitting the back, back of the head or neck (called a "rabbit-punch") or the kidneys. They are prohibited from holding the ropes for support when punching, holding an opponent while punching, or ducking below the belt of their opponent (dropping below the waist of your opponent, no matter the distance between).

If a "clinch" – a defensive move in which a boxer wraps their opponent's arms and holds on to create a pause – is broken by the referee, each fighter must take a full step back before punching again (alternatively, the referee may direct the fighters to "punch out" of the clinch). When a boxer is knocked down, the other boxer must immediately cease fighting and move to the furthest neutral corner of the ring until the referee has either ruled a knockout or called for the fight to continue.

Violations of these rules may be ruled "fouls" by the referee, who may issue warnings, deduct points, or disqualify an offending boxer, causing an automatic loss, depending on the seriousness and intentionality of the foul. An intentional foul that causes injury that prevents a fight from continuing usually causes the boxer who committed it to be disqualified. A fighter who suffers an accidental low-blow may be given up to five minutes to recover, after which they may be ruled knocked out if they are unable to continue. Accidental fouls that cause injury ending a bout may lead to a "no contest" result, or else cause the fight to go to a decision if enough rounds (typically four or more, or at least three in a four-round fight) have passed.

Unheard of in the modern era, but common during the early 20th Century in North America, a "newspaper decision (NWS)" might be made after a no decision bout had ended. A "no decision" bout occurred when, by law or by pre-arrangement of the fighters, if both boxers were still standing at the fight's conclusion and there was no knockout, no official decision was rendered and neither boxer was declared the winner. But this did not prevent the pool of ringside newspaper reporters from declaring a consensus result among themselves and printing a newspaper decision in their publications. Officially, however, a "no decision" bout resulted in neither boxer winning or losing. Boxing historians sometimes use these unofficial newspaper decisions in compiling fight records for illustrative purposes only. Often, media outlets covering a match will personally score the match, and post their scores as an independent sentence in their report.

Professional vs. amateur boxing

Throughout the 17th to 19th centuries, boxing bouts were motivated by money, as the fighters competed for prize money, promoters controlled the gate, and spectators bet on the result.

The modern Olympic movement revived interest in amateur sports, and amateur boxing became an Olympic sport in 1908. In their current form, Olympic and other amateur bouts are typically limited to three or four rounds, scoring is computed by points based on the number of clean blows landed, regardless of impact, and fighters wear protective headgear, reducing the number of injuries, knockdowns, and knockouts. Currently scoring blows in amateur boxing are subjectively counted by ringside judges, but the Australian Institute for Sport has demonstrated a prototype of an Automated Boxing Scoring System, which introduces scoring objectivity, improves safety, and arguably makes the sport more interesting to spectators. Professional boxing remains by far the most popular form of the sport globally, though amateur boxing is dominant in Cuba and some former Soviet republics. For most fighters, an amateur career, especially at the Olympics, serves to develop skills and gain experience in preparation for a professional career. Western boxers typically participate in one Olympics and then turn pro, Cubans and other socialist countries have an opportunity to collect multiple medals. In 2016, professional boxers were admitted in the Olympic Games and other tournaments sanctioned by AIBA. This was done in part to level the playing field and give all of the athletes the same opportunities government-sponsored boxers from socialist countries and post-Soviet republics have. However, professional organizations strongly opposed that decision.

Amateur boxing

Amateur boxing may be found at the collegiate level, at the Olympic Games, Commonwealth Games, Asian Games, etc. In many other venues sanctioned by amateur boxing associations. Amateur boxing has a point scoring system that measures the number of clean blows landed rather than physical damage. Bouts consist of three rounds of three minutes in the Olympic and Commonwealth Games, and three rounds of three minutes in a national ABA (Amateur Boxing Association) bout, each with a one-minute interval between rounds.

Competitors wear protective headgear and gloves with a white strip or circle across the knuckle. There are cases however, where white ended gloves are not required but any solid color may be worn. The white end is just a way to make it easier for judges to score clean hits. Each competitor must have their hands properly wrapped, pre-fight, for added protection on their hands and for added cushion under the gloves. Gloves worn by the fighters must be twelve ounces in weight unless the fighters weigh under , thus allowing them to wear ten ounce gloves. A punch is considered a scoring punch only when the boxers connect with the white portion of the gloves. Each punch that lands cleanly on the head or torso with sufficient force is awarded a point. A referee monitors the fight to ensure that competitors use only legal blows. A belt worn over the torso represents the lower limit of punches – any boxer repeatedly landing low blows below the belt is disqualified. Referees also ensure that the boxers don't use holding tactics to prevent the opponent from swinging. If this occurs, the referee separates the opponents and orders them to continue boxing. Repeated holding can result in a boxer being penalized or ultimately disqualified. Referees will stop the bout if a boxer is seriously injured, if one boxer is significantly dominating the other or if the score is severely imbalanced. Amateur bouts which end this way may be noted as "RSC" (referee stopped contest) with notations for an outclassed opponent (RSCO), outscored opponent (RSCOS), injury (RSCI) or head injury (RSCH).

Professional boxing

Professional bouts are usually much longer than amateur bouts, typically ranging from ten to twelve rounds, though four-round fights are common for less experienced fighters or club fighters. There are also some two- and three-round professional bouts, especially in Australia. Through the early 20th century, it was common for fights to have unlimited rounds, ending only when one fighter quit, benefiting high-energy fighters like Jack Dempsey. Fifteen rounds remained the internationally recognized limit for championship fights for most of the 20th century until the early 1980s, when the death of boxer Kim Duk-koo eventually prompted the World Boxing Council and other organizations sanctioning professional boxing to reduce the limit to twelve rounds.

Headgear is not permitted in professional bouts, and boxers are generally allowed to take much more damage before a fight is halted. At any time, the referee may stop the contest if he believes that one participant cannot defend himself due to injury. In that case, the other participant is awarded a technical knockout win. A technical knockout would also be awarded if a fighter lands a punch that opens a cut on the opponent, and the opponent is later deemed not fit to continue by a doctor because of the cut. For this reason, fighters often employ cutmen, whose job is to treat cuts between rounds so that the boxer is able to continue despite the cut. If a boxer simply quits fighting, or if his corner stops the fight, then the winning boxer is also awarded a technical knockout victory. In contrast with amateur boxing, professional male boxers have to be bare-chested.

Boxing styles

Definition of style
"Style" is often defined as the strategic approach a fighter takes during a bout. No two fighters' styles are alike, as each is determined by that individual's physical and mental attributes. Three main styles exist in boxing: outside fighter ("boxer"), brawler (or "slugger"), and inside fighter ("swarmer"). These styles may be divided into several special subgroups, such as counter puncher, etc. The main philosophy of the styles is, that each style has an advantage over one, but disadvantage over the other one. It follows the rock paper scissors scenario – boxer beats brawler, brawler beats swarmer, and swarmer beats boxer.

Boxer/out-fighter

A classic "boxer" or stylist (also known as an "out-fighter") seeks to maintain distance between himself and his opponent, fighting with faster, longer range punches, most notably the jab, and gradually wearing his opponent down. Due to this reliance on weaker punches, out-fighters tend to win by point decisions rather than by knockout, though some out-fighters have notable knockout records. They are often regarded as the best boxing strategists due to their ability to control the pace of the fight and lead their opponent, methodically wearing him down and exhibiting more skill and finesse than a brawler. Out-fighters need reach, hand speed, reflexes, and footwork.

Notable out-fighters include Muhammad Ali, Larry Holmes, Joe Calzaghe, Wilfredo Gómez, Salvador Sánchez, Cecilia Brækhus, Gene Tunney, Ezzard Charles, Willie Pep, Meldrick Taylor, Ricardo "Finito" López, Floyd Mayweather Jr., Roy Jones Jr., Sugar Ray Leonard, Miguel Vázquez, Sergio "Maravilla" Martínez, Wladimir Klitschko and Guillermo Rigondeaux. This style was also used by fictional boxer Apollo Creed.

Boxer-puncher
A boxer-puncher is a well-rounded boxer who is able to fight at close range with a combination of technique and power, often with the ability to knock opponents out with a combination and in some instances a single shot. Their movement and tactics are similar to that of an out-fighter (although they are generally not as mobile as an out-fighter), but instead of winning by decision, they tend to wear their opponents down using combinations and then move in to score the knockout. A boxer must be well rounded to be effective using this style.

Notable boxer-punchers include Muhammad Ali, Canelo Álvarez, Sugar Ray Leonard, Roy Jones Jr., Wladimir Klitschko, Vasyl Lomachenko, Lennox Lewis, Joe Louis, Wilfredo Gómez, Oscar De La Hoya, Archie Moore, Miguel Cotto, Nonito Donaire, Sam Langford, Henry Armstrong, Sugar Ray Robinson, Tony Zale, Carlos Monzón, Alexis Argüello, Érik Morales, Terry Norris, Marco Antonio Barrera, Naseem Hamed, Thomas Hearns, Julian Jackson and Gennady Golovkin.

Counter puncher
Counter punchers are slippery, defensive style fighters who often rely on their opponent's mistakes in order to gain the advantage, whether it be on the score cards or more preferably a knockout. They use their well-rounded defense to avoid or block shots and then immediately catch the opponent off guard with a well placed and timed punch. A fight with a skilled counter-puncher can turn into a war of attrition, where each shot landed is a battle in itself. Thus, fighting against counter punchers requires constant feinting and the ability to avoid telegraphing one's attacks. To be truly successful using this style they must have good reflexes, a high level of prediction and awareness, pinpoint accuracy and speed, both in striking and in footwork.

Notable counter punchers include Muhammad Ali, Joe Calzaghe, Vitali Klitschko, Evander Holyfield, Max Schmeling, Chris Byrd, Jim Corbett, Jack Johnson, Bernard Hopkins, Laszlo Papp, Jerry Quarry, Anselmo Moreno, James Toney, Marvin Hagler, Juan Manuel Márquez, Humberto Soto, Floyd Mayweather Jr., Roger Mayweather, Pernell Whitaker, Sergio Martínez and Guillermo Rigondeaux. This style of boxing is also used by fictional boxer Little Mac.

Counter punchers usually wear their opponents down by causing them to miss their punches. The more the opponent misses, the faster they tire, and the psychological effects of being unable to land a hit will start to sink in. The counter puncher often tries to outplay their opponent entirely, not just in a physical sense, but also in a mental and emotional sense. This style can be incredibly difficult, especially against seasoned fighters, but winning a fight without getting hit is often worth the pay-off. They usually try to stay away from the center of the ring, in order to outmaneuver and chip away at their opponents. A large advantage in counter-hitting is the forward momentum of the attacker, which drives them further into your return strike. As such, knockouts are more common than one would expect from a defensive style.

Brawler/slugger

A brawler is a fighter who generally lacks finesse and footwork in the ring, but makes up for it through sheer punching power. Many brawlers tend to lack mobility, preferring a less mobile, more stable platform and have difficulty pursuing fighters who are fast on their feet. They may also have a tendency to ignore combination punching in favor of continuous beat-downs with one hand and by throwing slower, more powerful single punches (such as hooks and uppercuts). Their slowness and predictable punching pattern (single punches with obvious leads) often leaves them open to counter punches, so successful brawlers must be able to absorb a substantial amount of punishment. However, not all brawler/slugger fighters are not mobile; some can move around and switch styles if needed but still have the brawler/slugger style such as Wilfredo Gómez, Prince Naseem Hamed and Danny García.

A brawler's most important assets are power and chin (the ability to absorb punishment while remaining able to continue boxing). Examples of this style include George Foreman, Rocky Marciano, Julio César Chávez, Roberto Durán, Jack Dempsey, Riddick Bowe, Danny García, Wilfredo Gómez, Sonny Liston, John L. Sullivan, Max Baer, Prince Naseem Hamed, Ray Mancini, David Tua, Arturo Gatti, Micky Ward, Brandon Ríos, Ruslan Provodnikov, Michael Katsidis, James Kirkland, Marcos Maidana, Vitali Klitschko, Jake LaMotta, Manny Pacquiao, and Ireland's John Duddy. This style of boxing was also used by fictional boxers Rocky Balboa and James "Clubber" Lang.

Brawlers tend to be more predictable and easy to hit but usually fare well enough against other fighting styles because they train to take punches very well. They often have a higher chance than other fighting styles to score a knockout against their opponents because they focus on landing big, powerful hits, instead of smaller, faster attacks. Oftentimes they place focus on training on their upper body instead of their entire body, to increase power and endurance. They also aim to intimidate their opponents because of their power, stature and ability to take a punch.

Swarmer/in-fighter

In-fighters/swarmers (sometimes called "pressure fighters") attempt to stay close to an opponent, throwing intense flurries and combinations of hooks and uppercuts. Mainly Mexican, Irish, Irish-American, Puerto Rican, and Mexican-American boxers popularized this style. A successful in-fighter often needs a good "chin" because swarming usually involves being hit with many jabs before they can maneuver inside where they are more effective. In-fighters operate best at close range because they are generally shorter and have less reach than their opponents and thus are more effective at a short distance where the longer arms of their opponents make punching awkward. However, several fighters tall for their division have been relatively adept at in-fighting as well as out-fighting.

The essence of a swarmer is non-stop aggression. Many short in-fighters use their stature to their advantage, employing a bob-and-weave defense by bending at the waist to slip underneath or to the sides of incoming punches. Unlike blocking, causing an opponent to miss a punch disrupts his balance, this permits forward movement past the opponent's extended arm and keeps the hands free to counter. A distinct advantage that in-fighters have is when throwing uppercuts, they can channel their entire bodyweight behind the punch; Mike Tyson was famous for throwing devastating uppercuts. Marvin Hagler was known for his hard "chin", punching power, body attack and the stalking of his opponents. Some in-fighters, like Mike Tyson, have been known for being notoriously hard to hit. The key to a swarmer is aggression, endurance, chin, and bobbing-and-weaving.

Notable in-fighters include Henry Armstrong, Aaron Pryor, Julio César Chávez, Jack Dempsey, Shawn Porter, Miguel Cotto, Gennady Golovkin, Joe Frazier, Danny García, Mike Tyson, Manny Pacquiao, Rocky Marciano, Wayne McCullough, James Braddock, Gerry Penalosa, Harry Greb, David Tua, James Toney and Ricky Hatton. This style was also used by the Street Fighter character Balrog.

Combinations of styles
All fighters have primary skills with which they feel most comfortable, but truly elite fighters are often able to incorporate auxiliary styles when presented with a particular challenge. For example, an out-fighter will sometimes plant his feet and counter punch, or a slugger may have the stamina to pressure fight with his power punches.

Old history of the development of boxing and its prevalence contribute to fusion of various types of martial arts and the emergence of new ones that are based on them. For example, a combination of boxing and sportive sambo techniques gave rise to a combat sambo.

Style matchups

There is a generally accepted rule of thumb about the success each of these boxing styles has against the others. In general, an in-fighter has an advantage over an out-fighter, an out-fighter has an advantage over a brawler, and a brawler has an advantage over an in-fighter; these form a cycle with each style being stronger relative to one, and weaker relative to another, with none dominating, as in rock paper scissors. Naturally, many other factors, such as the skill level and training of the combatants, determine the outcome of a fight, but the widely held belief in this relationship among the styles is embodied in the cliché amongst boxing fans and writers that "styles make fights".

Brawlers tend to overcome swarmers or in-fighters because, in trying to get close to the slugger, the in-fighter will invariably have to walk straight into the guns of the much harder-hitting brawler, so, unless the former has a very good chin and the latter's stamina is poor, the brawler's superior power will carry the day. A famous example of this type of match-up advantage would be George Foreman's knockout victory over Joe Frazier in their original bout "The Sunshine Showdown".

Although in-fighters struggle against heavy sluggers, they typically enjoy more success against out-fighters or boxers. Out-fighters prefer a slower fight, with some distance between themselves and the opponent. The in-fighter tries to close that gap and unleash furious flurries. On the inside, the out-fighter loses a lot of his combat effectiveness, because he cannot throw the hard punches. The in-fighter is generally successful in this case, due to his intensity in advancing on his opponent and his good agility, which makes him difficult to evade. For example, the swarming Joe Frazier, though easily dominated by the slugger George Foreman, was able to create many more problems for the boxer Muhammad Ali in their three fights. Joe Louis, after retirement, admitted that he hated being crowded, and that swarmers like untied/undefeated champ Rocky Marciano would have caused him style problems even in his prime.

The boxer or out-fighter tends to be most successful against a brawler, whose slow speed (both hand and foot) and poor technique makes him an easy target to hit for the faster out-fighter. The out-fighter's main concern is to stay alert, as the brawler only needs to land one good punch to finish the fight. If the out-fighter can avoid those power punches, he can often wear the brawler down with fast jabs, tiring him out. If he is successful enough, he may even apply extra pressure in the later rounds in an attempt to achieve a knockout. Most classic boxers, such as Muhammad Ali, enjoyed their best successes against sluggers.

An example of a style matchup was the historical fight of Julio César Chávez, a swarmer or in-fighter, against Meldrick Taylor, the boxer or out-fighter (see Julio César Chávez vs. Meldrick Taylor). The match was nicknamed "Thunder Meets Lightning" as an allusion to punching power of Chávez and blinding speed of Taylor. Chávez was the epitome of the "Mexican" style of boxing. Taylor's hand and foot speed and boxing abilities gave him the early advantage, allowing him to begin building a large lead on points. Chávez remained relentless in his pursuit of Taylor and due to his greater punching power Chávez slowly punished Taylor. Coming into the later rounds, Taylor was bleeding from the mouth, his entire face was swollen, the bones around his eye socket had been broken, he had swallowed a considerable amount of his own blood, and as he grew tired, Taylor was increasingly forced into exchanging blows with Chávez, which only gave Chávez a greater chance to cause damage. While there was little doubt that Taylor had solidly won the first three quarters of the fight, the question at hand was whether he would survive the final quarter. Going into the final round, Taylor held a secure lead on the scorecards of two of the three judges. Chávez would have to knock Taylor out to claim a victory, whereas Taylor merely needed to stay away from the Mexican legend. However, Taylor did not stay away, but continued to trade blows with Chávez. As he did so, Taylor showed signs of extreme exhaustion, and every tick of the clock brought Taylor closer to victory unless Chávez could knock him out.
With about a minute left in the round, Chávez hit Taylor squarely with several hard punches and stayed on the attack, continuing to hit Taylor with well-placed shots. Finally, with about 25 seconds to go, Chávez landed a hard right hand that caused Taylor to stagger forward towards a corner, forcing Chávez back ahead of him. Suddenly Chávez stepped around Taylor, positioning him so that Taylor was trapped in the corner, with no way to escape from Chávez' desperate final flurry. Chávez then nailed Taylor with a tremendous right hand that dropped the younger man. By using the ring ropes to pull himself up, Taylor managed to return to his feet and was given the mandatory 8-count. Referee Richard Steele asked Taylor twice if he was able to continue fighting, but Taylor failed to answer. Steele then concluded that Taylor was unfit to continue and signaled that he was ending the fight, resulting in a TKO victory for Chávez with only two seconds to go in the bout.

Equipment
Since boxing involves forceful, repetitive punching, precautions must be taken to prevent damage to bones in the hand. Most trainers do not allow boxers to train and spar without wrist wraps and boxing gloves. Hand wraps are used to secure the bones in the hand, and the gloves are used to protect the hands from blunt injury, allowing boxers to throw punches with more force than if they did not use them. Gloves have been required in competition since the late nineteenth century, though modern boxing gloves are much heavier than those worn by early twentieth-century fighters. Prior to a bout, both boxers agree upon the weight of gloves to be used in the bout, with the understanding that lighter gloves allow heavy punchers to inflict more damage. The brand of gloves can also affect the impact of punches, so this too is usually stipulated before a bout. Both sides are allowed to inspect the wraps and gloves of the opponent to help ensure both are within agreed upon specifications and no tampering has taken place.

A mouthguard is important to protect the teeth and gums from injury, and to cushion the jaw, resulting in a decreased chance of knockout. Both fighters must wear soft soled shoes to reduce the damage from accidental (or intentional) stepping on feet. While older boxing boots more commonly resembled those of a professional wrestler, modern boxing shoes and boots tend to be quite similar to their amateur wrestling counterparts.

Boxers practice their skills on several types of punching bags. A small, tear-drop-shaped "speed bag" is used to hone reflexes and repetitive punching skills, while a large cylindrical "heavy bag" filled with sand, a synthetic substitute, or water is used to practice power punching and body blows. The double-end bag is usually connected by elastic on the top and bottom and moves randomly upon getting struck and helps the fighter work on accuracy and reflexes. In addition to these distinctive pieces of equipment, boxers also use sport-nonspecific training equipment to build strength, speed, agility, and stamina. Common training equipment includes free weights, rowing machines, jump rope, and medicine balls.

Boxers also use punch/focus mitts in which a trainer calls out certain combinations and the fighter strikes the mitts accordingly. This is a great exercise for stamina as the boxer isn't allowed to go at his own pace but that of the trainer, typically forcing the fighter to endure a higher output and volume than usual. In addition, they also allow trainers to make boxers utilize footwork and distances more accurately.

Boxing matches typically take place in a boxing ring, a raised platform surrounded by ropes attached to posts rising in each corner. The term "ring" has come to be used as a metaphor for many aspects of prize fighting in general.

Technique

Stance
The modern boxing stance differs substantially from the typical boxing stances of the 19th and early 20th centuries. The modern stance has a more upright vertical-armed guard, as opposed to the more horizontal, knuckles-facing-forward guard adopted by early 20th century hook users such as Jack Johnson.

In a fully upright stance, the boxer stands with the legs shoulder-width apart and the rear foot a half-step in front of the lead man. Right-handed or orthodox boxers lead with the left foot and fist (for most penetration power). Both feet are parallel, and the right heel is off the ground. The lead (left) fist is held vertically about six inches in front of the face at eye level. The rear (right) fist is held beside the chin and the elbow tucked against the ribcage to protect the body. The chin is tucked into the chest to avoid punches to the jaw which commonly cause knock-outs and is often kept slightly off-center. Wrists are slightly bent to avoid damage when punching and the elbows are kept tucked in to protect the ribcage. Some boxers fight from a crouch, leaning forward and keeping their feet closer together. The stance described is considered the "textbook" stance and fighters are encouraged to change it around once it's been mastered as a base. Case in point, many fast fighters have their hands down and have almost exaggerated footwork, while brawlers or bully fighters tend to slowly stalk their opponents. In order to retain their stance boxers take 'the first step in any direction with the foot already leading in that direction.'

Different stances allow for bodyweight to be differently positioned and emphasised; this may in turn alter how powerfully and explosively a type of punch can be delivered. For instance, a crouched stance allows for the bodyweight to be positioned further forward over the lead left leg. If a lead left hook is thrown from this position, it will produce a powerful springing action in the lead leg and produce a more explosive punch. This springing action could not be generated effectively, for this punch, if an upright stance was used or if the bodyweight was positioned predominantly over the back leg. Mike Tyson was a keen practitioner of a crouched stance and this style of power punching. The preparatory positioning of the bodyweight over the bent lead leg is also known as an isometric preload.

Left-handed or southpaw fighters use a mirror image of the orthodox stance, which can create problems for orthodox fighters unaccustomed to receiving jabs, hooks, or crosses from the opposite side. The southpaw stance, conversely, is vulnerable to a straight right hand.

North American fighters tend to favor a more balanced stance, facing the opponent almost squarely, while many European fighters stand with their torso turned more to the side. The positioning of the hands may also vary, as some fighters prefer to have both hands raised in front of the face, risking exposure to body shots.

Punches
There are four basic punches in boxing: the jab, cross, hook and uppercut. Any punch other than a jab is considered a power punch. If a boxer is right-handed (orthodox), their left hand is the lead hand and his right hand is the rear hand. For a left-handed boxer or southpaw, the hand positions are reversed. For clarity, the following assumes a right-handed boxer.

 Jab – A quick, straight punch thrown with the lead hand from the guard position. The jab extends from the side of the torso and typically does not pass in front of it. It is accompanied by a small, clockwise rotation of the torso and hips, while the fist rotates 90 degrees, becoming horizontal upon impact. As the punch reaches full extension, the lead shoulder can be brought up to guard the chin. The rear hand remains next to the face to guard the jaw. After making contact with the target, the lead hand is retracted quickly to resume a guard position in front of the face.
 The jab is recognized as the most important punch in a boxer's arsenal because it provides a fair amount of its own cover and it leaves the least space for a counter punch from the opponent. It has the longest reach of any punch and does not require commitment or large weight transfers. Due to its relatively weak power, the jab is often used as a tool to gauge distances, probe an opponent's defenses, harass an opponent, and set up heavier, more powerful punches. A half-step may be added, moving the entire body into the punch, for additional power. Some notable boxers who have been able to develop relative power in their jabs and use it to punish or wear down their opponents to some effect include Larry Holmes and Wladimir Klitschko.
 Cross – A powerful, straight punch thrown with the rear hand. From the guard position, the rear hand is thrown from the chin, crossing the body and traveling towards the target in a straight line. The rear shoulder is thrust forward and finishes just touching the outside of the chin. At the same time, the lead hand is retracted and tucked against the face to protect the inside of the chin. For additional power, the torso and hips are rotated counter-clockwise as the cross is thrown. A measure of an ideally extended cross is that the shoulder of the striking arm, the knee of the front leg and the ball of the front foot are on the same vertical plane.
 Weight is also transferred from the rear foot to the lead foot, resulting in the rear heel turning outwards as it acts as a fulcrum for the transfer of weight. Body rotation and the sudden weight transfer give the cross its power. Like the jab, a half-step forward may be added. After the cross is thrown, the hand is retracted quickly and the guard position resumed. It can be used to counter punch a jab, aiming for the opponent's head (or a counter to a cross aimed at the body) or to set up a hook. The cross is also called a "straight" or "right", especially if it does not cross the opponent's outstretched jab.
 Hook – A semi-circular punch thrown with the lead hand to the side of the opponent's head. From the guard position, the elbow is drawn back with a horizontal fist (palm facing down) though in modern times a wide percentage of fighters throw the hook with a vertical fist (palm facing themselves). The rear hand is tucked firmly against the jaw to protect the chin. The torso and hips are rotated clockwise, propelling the fist through a tight, clockwise arc across the front of the body and connecting with the target.
 At the same time, the lead foot pivots clockwise, turning the left heel outwards. Upon contact, the hook's circular path ends abruptly and the lead hand is pulled quickly back into the guard position. A hook may also target the lower body and this technique is sometimes called the "rip" to distinguish it from the conventional hook to the head. The hook may also be thrown with the rear hand. Notable left hookers include Joe Frazier, Roy Jones Jr. and Mike Tyson.

 Uppercut – A vertical, rising punch thrown with the rear hand. From the guard position, the torso shifts slightly to the right, the rear hand drops below the level of the opponent's chest and the knees are bent slightly. From this position, the rear hand is thrust upwards in a rising arc towards the opponent's chin or torso.
 At the same time, the knees push upwards quickly and the torso and hips rotate anti-clockwise and the rear heel turns outward, mimicking the body movement of the cross. The strategic utility of the uppercut depends on its ability to "lift" an opponent's body, setting it off-balance for successive attacks. The right uppercut followed by a left hook is a deadly combination employing the uppercut to lift an opponent's chin into a vulnerable position, then the hook to knock the opponent out.

These different punch types can be thrown in rapid succession to form combinations or "combos". The most common is the jab and cross combination, nicknamed the "one-two combo". This is usually an effective combination, because the jab blocks the opponent's view of the cross, making it easier to land cleanly and forcefully.

A large, swinging circular punch starting from a cocked-back position with the arm at a longer extension than the hook and all of the fighter's weight behind it is sometimes referred to as a "roundhouse", "haymaker", "overhand", or sucker-punch. Relying on body weight and centripetal force within a wide arc, the roundhouse can be a powerful blow, but it is often a wild and uncontrolled punch that leaves the fighter delivering it off balance and with an open guard.

Wide, looping punches have the further disadvantage of taking more time to deliver, giving the opponent ample warning to react and counter. For this reason, the haymaker or roundhouse is not a conventional punch, and is regarded by trainers as a mark of poor technique or desperation. Sometimes it has been used, because of its immense potential power, to finish off an already staggering opponent who seems unable or unlikely to take advantage of the poor position it leaves the puncher in.

Another unconventional punch is the rarely used bolo punch, in which the opponent swings an arm out several times in a wide arc, usually as a distraction, before delivering with either that or the other arm.

An illegal punch to the back of the head or neck is known as a rabbit punch.

Both the hook and uppercut may be thrown with both hands, resulting in differing footwork and positioning from that described above if thrown by the other hand. Generally the analogous opposite is true of the footwork and torso movement.

Defense
There are several basic maneuvers a boxer can use in order to evade or block punches, depicted and discussed below.

 Slip – Slipping rotates the body slightly so that an incoming punch passes harmlessly next to the head. As the opponent's punch arrives, the boxer sharply rotates the hips and shoulders. This turns the chin sideways and allows the punch to "slip" past. Muhammad Ali was famous for extremely fast and close slips, as was an early Mike Tyson.
 Sway or fade – To anticipate a punch and move the upper body or head back so that it misses or has its force appreciably lessened. Also called "rolling with the punch" or " Riding The Punch.
 Bob and weave – Bobbing moves the head laterally and beneath an incoming punch. As the opponent's punch arrives, the boxer bends the legs quickly and simultaneously shifts the body either slightly right or left. Once the punch has been evaded, the boxer "weaves" back to an upright position, emerging on either the outside or inside of the opponent's still-extended arm. To move outside the opponent's extended arm is called "bobbing to the outside". To move inside the opponent's extended arm is called "bobbing to the inside". Joe Frazier, Jack Dempsey, Mike Tyson and Rocky Marciano were masters of bobbing and weaving.
 Parry/block – Parrying or blocking uses the boxer's shoulder, hands or arms as defensive tools to protect against incoming attacks. A block generally receives a punch while a parry tends to deflect it. A "palm", "catch", or "cuff" is a defence which intentionally takes the incoming punch on the palm portion of the defender's glove.
 Cover-up – Covering up is the last opportunity (other than rolling with a punch) to avoid an incoming strike to an unprotected face or body. Generally speaking, the hands are held high to protect the head and chin and the forearms are tucked against the torso to impede body shots. When protecting the body, the boxer rotates the hips and lets incoming punches "roll" off the guard. To protect the head, the boxer presses both fists against the front of the face with the forearms parallel and facing outwards. This type of guard is weak against attacks from below.
 Clinch – Clinching is a form of trapping or a rough form of grappling and occurs when the distance between both fighters has closed and straight punches cannot be employed. In this situation, the boxer attempts to hold or "tie up" the opponent's hands so he is unable to throw hooks or uppercuts. To perform a clinch, the boxer loops both hands around the outside of the opponent's shoulders, scooping back under the forearms to grasp the opponent's arms tightly against his own body. In this position, the opponent's arms are pinned and cannot be used to attack. Clinching is a temporary match state and is quickly dissipated by the referee. Clinching is technically against the rules, and in amateur fights points are deducted fairly quickly for it. It is unlikely, however, to see points deducted for a clinch in professional boxing.

Unorthodox strategies
 Rope-a-dope : Used by Muhammad Ali in his 1974 "the Rumble in the Jungle" bout against George Foreman, the rope-a-dope method involves lying back against the ropes, covering up defensively as much as possible and allowing the opponent to attempt numerous punches. The back-leaning posture, which does not cause the defending boxer to become as unbalanced as he would during normal backward movement, also maximizes the distance of the defender's head from his opponent, increasing the probability that punches will miss their intended target. Weathering the blows that do land, the defender lures the opponent into expending energy while conserving his/her own. If successful, the attacking opponent will eventually tire, creating defensive flaws which the boxer can exploit. In modern boxing, the rope-a-dope is generally discouraged since most opponents are not fooled by it and few boxers possess the physical toughness to withstand a prolonged, unanswered assault. Recently, however, eight-division world champion Manny Pacquiao skillfully used the strategy to gauge the power of welterweight titlist Miguel Cotto in November 2009. Pacquiao followed up the rope-a-dope gambit with a withering knockdown. Tyson Fury also attempted this against Francesco Pianeto but didn't pull it off as smoothly.
 Bolo punch: Occasionally seen in Olympic boxing, the bolo punch is an arm punch which owes its power to the shortening of a circular arc rather than to transference of body weight; it tends to have more of an effect due to the surprise of the odd angle it lands at rather than the actual power of the punch. This is more of a gimmick than a technical maneuver; this punch is not taught, being on the same plane in boxing technicality as is the Ali shuffle. Nevertheless, a few professional boxers have used the bolo-punch to great effect, including former welterweight champions Sugar Ray Leonard, and Kid Gavilán as well as current British fighter Chris Eubank Jr. Middleweight champion Ceferino Garcia is regarded as the inventor of the bolo punch.

 Overhand: The overhand is a punch, thrown from the rear hand, not found in every boxer's arsenal. Unlike the cross, which has a trajectory parallel to the ground, the overhand has a looping circular arc as it is thrown over the shoulder with the palm facing away from the boxer. It is especially popular with smaller stature boxers trying to reach taller opponents. Boxers who have used this punch consistently and effectively include former heavyweight champions Rocky Marciano and Tim Witherspoon, as well as MMA champions Chuck Liddell and Fedor Emelianenko. The overhand has become a popular weapon in other tournaments that involve fist striking. Deontay Wilder heavily favours and is otherwise known for knocking many of his opponents out with one of his right overhands.
 Check hook: A check hook is employed to prevent aggressive boxers from lunging in. There are two parts to the check hook. The first part consists of a regular hook. The second, trickier part involves the footwork. As the opponent lunges in, the boxer should throw the hook and pivot on his left foot and swing his right foot 180 degrees around. If executed correctly, the aggressive boxer will lunge in and sail harmlessly past his opponent like a bull missing a matador. This is rarely seen in professional boxing as it requires a great disparity in skill level to execute. Technically speaking it has been said that there is no such thing as a check hook and that it is simply a hook applied to an opponent that has lurched forward and past his opponent who simply hooks him on the way past. Others have argued that the check hook exists but is an illegal punch due to it being a pivot punch which is illegal in the sport. Floyd Mayweather, Jr. employed the use of a check hook against Ricky Hatton, which sent Hatton flying head first into the corner post and being knocked down.

Ring corner

In boxing, each fighter is given a corner of the ring where he rests in between rounds for 1 minute and where his trainers stand. Typically, three men stand in the corner besides the boxer himself; these are the trainer, the assistant trainer and the cutman. The trainer and assistant typically give advice to the boxer on what he is doing wrong as well as encouraging him if he is losing. The cutman is a cutaneous doctor responsible for keeping the boxer's face and eyes free of cuts, blood and excessive swelling. This is of particular importance because many fights are stopped because of cuts or swelling that threaten the boxer's eyes.

In addition, the corner is responsible for stopping the fight if they feel their fighter is in grave danger of permanent injury. The corner will occasionally throw in a white towel to signify a boxer's surrender (the idiomatic phrase "to throw in the towel", meaning to give up, derives from this practice). This can be seen in the fight between Diego Corrales and Floyd Mayweather. In that fight, Corrales' corner surrendered despite Corrales' steadfast refusal.

Health concerns

Knocking a person unconscious or even causing a concussion may cause permanent brain damage. There is no clear division between the force required to knock a person out and the force likely to kill a person. Additionally, contact sports, especially combat sports, are directly related to a brain disease called chronic traumatic encephalopathy, abbreviated as CTE. This disease begins to develop during the life of the athlete, and continues to develop even after sports activity has ceased.

In March 1981, neurosurgeon Dr. Fred Sonstein sought to use CAT scans in an attempt to track the degeneration of boxers' cognitive functions after seeing the decline of Bennie Briscoe. From 1980 to 2007, more than 200 amateur boxers, professional boxers and Toughman fighters died due to ring or training injuries. In 1983, editorials in the Journal of the American Medical Association called for a ban on boxing. The editor, Dr. George Lundberg, called boxing an "obscenity" that "should not be sanctioned by any civilized society". Since then, the British, Canadian and Australian Medical Associations have called for bans on boxing.

Supporters of the ban state that boxing is the only sport where hurting the other athlete is the goal. Dr. Bill O'Neill, boxing spokesman for the British Medical Association, has supported the BMA's proposed ban on boxing: "It is the only sport where the intention is to inflict serious injury on your opponent, and we feel that we must have a total ban on boxing." Opponents respond that such a position is misguided opinion, stating that amateur boxing is scored solely according to total connecting blows with no award for "injury". They observe that many skilled professional boxers have had rewarding careers without inflicting injury on opponents by accumulating scoring blows and avoiding punches winning rounds scored 10-9 by the 10-point must system, and they note that there are many other sports where concussions are much more prevalent. However, the data shows that the concussion rate in boxing is the highest of all contact sports. In addition, repetitive and subconcussive blows to the head, and not just concussions, cause CTE, and the evidence indicates that brain damage and the effects of CTE are more severe in boxing.

In 2007, one study of amateur boxers showed that protective headgear did not prevent brain damage, and another found that amateur boxers faced a high risk of brain damage. The Gothenburg study analyzed temporary levels of neurofilament light in cerebral spinal fluid which they conclude is evidence of damage, even though the levels soon subside. More comprehensive studies of neurological function on larger samples performed by Johns Hopkins University in 1994 and accident rates analyzed by National Safety Council in 2017 show amateur boxing is a comparatively safe sport due to the regulations of amateur boxing and a greater control of the athletes, although the studies did not focus on CTE or its long-term effects. In addition, a good training methodology and short career can reduce the effects of brain damage.

In 1997, the American Association of Professional Ringside Physicians was established to create medical protocols through research and education to prevent injuries in boxing.

Professional boxing is forbidden in Iceland, Iran and North Korea. It was banned in Sweden until 2007 when the ban was lifted but strict restrictions, including four three-minute rounds for fights, were imposed. Boxing was banned in Albania from 1965 until the fall of Communism in 1991. Norway legalized professional boxing in December 2014.

The International Boxing Association (AIBA) restricted the use of head guards for senior males after 2013. A literature review study analyses present knowledge about protecting headgear and injury prevention in boxing to determine if injury risks associated with not head guard usage increased. The research of the reviewed literature indicates that head guards cover well against lacerations and skull fractures. Therefore, AIBA’s decision to terminate the head guard must be considered cautiously, and injury rates among (male) boxers should be continuously evaluated.

Possible health benefits 

Like other active and dynamic sports, boxing may be argued to provide some general benefits, such as fat burning, increased muscle tone, strong bones and ligaments, cardiovascular fitness, muscular endurance, improved core stability, co-ordination and body awareness, strength and power, stress relief and self-esteem.

Boxing Halls of Fame

The sport of boxing has two internationally recognized boxing halls of fame; the International Boxing Hall of Fame (IBHOF) and the Boxing Hall of Fame Las Vegas. The latter opened in Las Vegas, Nevada in 2013 and was founded by Steve Lott, former assistant manager for Mike Tyson.

The International Boxing Hall of Fame opened in Canastota, New York in 1989. The first inductees in 1990 included Jack Johnson, Benny Leonard, Jack Dempsey, Henry Armstrong, Sugar Ray Robinson, Archie Moore, and Muhammad Ali. Other world-class figures include Salvador Sanchez, Jose Napoles, Roberto "Manos de Piedra" Durán, Ricardo Lopez, Gabriel "Flash" Elorde, Vicente Saldivar, Ismael Laguna, Eusebio Pedroza, Carlos Monzón, Azumah Nelson, Rocky Marciano, Pipino Cuevas, Wilfred Benitez, Wilfredo Gomez, Felix Trinidad and Ken Buchanan. The Hall of Fame's induction ceremony is held every June as part of a four-day event. The fans who come to Canastota for the Induction Weekend are treated to a number of events, including scheduled autograph sessions, boxing exhibitions, a parade featuring past and present inductees, and the induction ceremony itself.

The Boxing Hall of Fame Las Vegas features the $75 million ESPN Classic Sports fight film and tape library and radio broadcast collection. The collection includes the fights of many great champions, including: Muhammad Ali, Mike Tyson, George Foreman, Roberto Durán, Marvin Hagler, Jack Dempsey, Joe Louis, Joe Frazier, Rocky Marciano and Sugar Ray Robinson. It is this exclusive fight film library that will separate the Boxing Hall of Fame Las Vegas from the other halls of fame which do not have rights to any video of their sports. The inaugural inductees included Muhammad Ali, Henry Armstrong, Tony Canzoneri, Ezzard Charles, Julio César Chávez Sr., Jack Dempsey, Roberto Durán, Joe Louis, and Sugar Ray Robinson.

Governing and sanctioning bodies

 Governing bodies
 British Boxing Board of Control (BBBofC)
 European Boxing Union (EBU)
 Nevada State Athletic Commission (NSAC)

 Major sanctioning bodies
 World Boxing Association (WBA)
 World Boxing Council (WBC)
 International Boxing Federation (IBF)
 World Boxing Organization (WBO)

 Intermediate
 International Boxing Organization (IBO)

Novice
 Intercontinental Boxing Federation (IBFed)

Amateur
 International Boxing Association (IBA; now also professional)

Boxing rankings

There are various organization and websites, that rank boxers in both weight class and pound-for-pound manner.
 Transnational Boxing Rankings Board (ratings )
 ESPN (ratings)
 The Ring (ratings)
 BoxRec (ratings)
Fightstat (rating)

See also

 List of current world boxing champions
 List of female boxers
 List of male boxers
 Milling – military training exercise related to boxing
 Undisputed champion
 Weight class in boxing
 Women's boxing
 World Colored Heavyweight Championship

Notes

References

Bibliography

 Accidents Take Lives of Young Alumni (July/August 2005). Illinois Alumni, 18(1), 47.
 Death Under the Spotlight: The Manuel Velazquez Boxing Fatality Collection
 Baker, Mark Allen (2010). TITLE TOWN, USA, Boxing in Upstate New York. 
 Fleischer, Nat, Sam Andre, Nigel Collins, Dan Rafael (2002). An Illustrated History of Boxing. Citadel Press. 
 Fox, James A. (2001). Boxing. Stewart, Tabori and Chang. 
 Gunn M, Ormerod D. The legality of boxing. Legal Studies. 1995;15:181.
 Halbert, Christy (2003). The Ultimate Boxer: Understanding the Sport and Skills of Boxing. Impact Seminars, Inc. 
 Hatmaker, Mark (2004). Boxing Mastery: Advanced Technique, Tactics, and Strategies from the Sweet Science. Tracks Publishing. 
 McIlvanney, Hugh (2001). The Hardest Game: McIlvanney on Boxing. McGraw-Hill. 
 Myler, Patrick (1997). A Century of Boxing Greats: Inside the Ring with the Hundred Best Boxers. Robson Books (UK) / Parkwest Publications (US). .
 Price, Edmund The Science of Self Defence: A Treatise on Sparring and Wrestling, 1867 (available at Internet Archive, access date 26 June 2018).
 Robert Anasi (2003). The Gloves: A Boxing Chronicle. North Point Press. 
 Schulberg, Budd (2007). Ringside: A Treasury of Boxing Reportage. Ivan R. Dee. 
 Silverman, Jeff (2004). The Greatest Boxing Stories Ever Told: Thirty-Six Incredible Tales from the Ring. The Lyons Press. 
 Snowdon, David (2013). Writing the Prizefight: Pierce Egan's Boxiana World (Peter Lang Ltd)
 Scully, John Learn to Box with the Iceman
 weight classification, "2009"
 U.S. Amateur Boxing Inc. (1994). Coaching Olympic Style Boxing. Cooper Pub Group. 1-884-12525-5
 A Pictorial History of Boxing, Sam Andre and Nat Fleischer, Hamlyn, 1988, 
 History of London Boxing. BBC News. 
 Ronald J. Ross, M.D., Cole, Monroe, Thompson, Jay S., Kim, Kyung H.: "Boxers - Computed Axial Tomography, Electroencephalography and Neurological Evaluation." Journal of the American Medical Association, Vol. 249, No. 2, 211–213, January 14, 1983.

External links

 Official website of the International Boxing Hall of Fame
 Boxing. Britannica.com Online.
 
 Boxing Prints Collection. General Collection, Beinecke Rare Book and Manuscript Library, Yale University.
 

 
Combat sports
Individual sports
Summer Olympic sports
Articles containing video clips
European martial arts